Thomas Arthur Nelson MID (22 September 1876 – 9 April 1917) was a Scotland international rugby union player. He later became a book publisher in his family's firm of Thomas Nelson and Sons. He was killed in the First World War.

Background

He was born on 22 September 1876, the son of the publisher Thomas Nelson and his wife Jessie Kemp. The family lived in the house of their grandfather Thomas Nelson: Abden House on the south of Edinburgh, the grandfather having died in 1861. His father built a new house, St Leonards, in the grounds of Abden House and the family moved there on its completion in 1890.

Nelson obtained an estate at Achnacloich, on the shore of Loch Etive near Oban. He spent a considerable part of each year there.

Rugby Union career

Amateur career

He was educated at Edinburgh Academy, where he became a rugby union player. He played for a combined Edinburgh Academy - Watsons College schoolboy side in January 1895.

He then went to study Classics at Oxford University, where he befriended John Buchan. Nelson played rugby union for Oxford University, playing for them from 1896. He captained the side in 1900.

Provincial career

Nelson was named in the Anglo-Scots side to face South of Scotland District on 25 December 1897. The match was called off.

He was originally named in the Provinces District side in December 1898, but his selection fell through. It was remarked that Nelson was not expected to turn out for the Provinces District in their match against Cities District on 14 January 1899.

International career

Nelson was capped for Scotland in 1898. He rivalled Allan Smith for a place in the international side. It was thought that Nelson would get a place at Centre in front of the Smith for the Ireland match as Smith was struggling for fitness. Smith started that match, but Nelson played alongside Smith at Centre for the match against England.

Publishing career

The John Buchan novel The Thirty-Nine Steps (1915) is dedicated to him.  Nelson and Buchan had been friends since Nelson was an undergraduate at University College, Oxford. He became head of the family publishing firm of Thomas Nelson and Sons, which employed Buchan as literary advisor and was one of the writer's publishers.

He was noted as a benevolent owner of the company. The publishing house had an athletics club and Nelson gave over a portion of his family estate so that the club could use it. The company was noted as a pioneer in looking after the health of its employees at the time; by employing an official to look after their health.

Military career

At the First World War, Nelson became a Captain with the Lothians and Border Horse attached to the Machine Gun Corps. He then moved to special service.

Death

Nelson was killed on 9 April 1917 on the first day of the Battle of Arras in World War I He was killed by a stray shell. He had been on the front for 18 months.

He is buried in Faubourg D'Amiens Cemetery, near Arras, grave reference VII.G.26, He is also memorialised on his parents grave in Grange Cemetery in south Edinburgh.  and on the Scottish Rugby Union War Memorial at Murrayfield Stadium.
The Hull Daily Mail headlined A Publishers Fortune detailing that Nelson of Achnacloich in Argyll left an estate of £470,782. £219,300 of that estate represented his holding in the publishing firm.

Family

In 1903 he was married to Margaret Balfour, daughter of the Liverpool merchant, Alexander Balfour. They had six children, including Alexander Ronan Nelson (1906–1997) and Elisabeth Nelson (1912–1999), who married Lord Bryan Walter Guinness, then becoming Lady Moyne, Elizabeth Guinness.

Following his death Margaret married Paul Maze (1887–1979), a Frenchman, and became known as Margaret Balfour Nelson Maze.

References

Sources

 Bath, Richard (ed.), The Scotland Rugby Miscellany (Vision Sports Publishing Ltd, 2007)

External links
 Commonwealth War Graves database
 An entire team wiped out by the Great War (The Scotsman)

1876 births
1917 deaths
People educated at Edinburgh Academy
Scottish rugby union players
Scotland international rugby union players
Oxford University RFC players
British military personnel killed in World War I
British Yeomanry officers
Rugby union players from Edinburgh
Machine Gun Corps officers
Lothians and Border Horse officers
Rugby union centres
Burials in France
Military personnel from Edinburgh
British Army personnel of World War I